Belén Andaquies is a town and municipality in Caquetá Department, Colombia.

Climate
Belén de Andaqies has a very wet tropical rainforest climate (Af).

References

Municipalities of Caquetá Department